NA-242 Karachi Keamari-I is a constituency for the National Assembly of Pakistan that encompasses Baldia.

Members of Parliament

2002–2018: NA-241 Karachi-III

2018-2022: NA-249 Karachi West-II

Election 2002 

General elections were held on 10 Oct 2002. Muhammad Laeeq Khan of Muttahida Majlis-e-Amal won by 26,812 votes.

Election 2008 

General elections were held on 18 Feb 2008. Syed A Iqbal Qadri of Muttahida Qaumi Movement won by 93,617 votes.

Election 2013 

General elections were held on 11 May 2013. Syed A Iqbal Qadri of Muttahida Qaumi Movement won by 95,584 votes and became the member of National Assembly.

Election 2018 

General elections were held on 25 July 2018.

By-elections 2021

By-elections 2021 was held in NA-249 Karachi on 29 April 2021. The Election Commission of Pakistan stayed the process for consolidation of result and fixed May 4 as the date for hearing of Pakistan Muslim League-N candidate, Miftah Ismail’s application seeking a recount of votes. Upon accepting his request, lawmakers were asked by the ECP to reach the office of the returning officer (RO) on May 6 for the recount. On May 6 recounting of votes again started which held until 8 May and in the final result PPP candidate was again declared as the winner with the margin of 909 votes from its rival PML-N. On the other hand, all of the four main political parties (PML-N, PSP, PTI and MQM-Pakistan) boycotted this recount demanding the repoll again in whole constituency.

See also
NA-241 Karachi South-II
NA-243 Karachi Keamari-II

References

External links 
Election result's official website

NA-241
Karachi